The 1982–83 Idaho Vandals men's basketball team represented the University of Idaho during the 1982–83 NCAA Division I men's basketball season. The two-time defending champions of the Big Sky Conference, Vandals were led by fifth-year head coach Don Monson and played their home games on campus at the Kibbie Dome in Moscow, Idaho.

The Vandals successfully defended their title in the Far West Classic at Portland in late December, and had a  record in mid-January, and appeared capable of a third consecutive conference title. Four road defeats in conference and the home loss to Montana resulted in a tie for third place in the regular season with the Grizzlies, who swept their two-game series. With an opportunity to three-peat, the Vandals were the low seed in the four-team Big Sky tourney in Reno. They lost by five points to host Nevada-Reno in the semifinals, and neither was selected for the 52-team NCAA tournament; Weber State won the final 

Idaho became the first Big Sky team to earn an invitation to  but lost in the first round at  they led by three at the half at Gill Coliseum, but lost by  the Beavers had also ended UI's season the previous year, in the Sweet Sixteen of the NCAA tournament. In both seasons, Idaho defeated OSU in the Far West Classic in late December, but lost the rematch 

Between semesters on December 20, the Vandals played a home game at Columbia High School in Richland, Washington, where senior guard Brian Kellerman had starred, and 4,100 packed the Art Dawald Gym for the homecoming. The popular Monson had coached at nearby Pasco High School for nine years  and senior center Kelvin Smith was a PHS  Idaho made a lengthy trip to South Carolina in January for a nationally televised

Aftermath
Several days after the NIT loss in Corvallis, Monson expectedly left his alma mater for the University of Oregon in Eugene; he led the Ducks for nine seasons in the Pac-10, with three NIT appearances. Assistant coach Barry Collier applied for the Idaho vacancy, but athletic Bill Belknap hired Bill Trumbo, a junior college head coach from northern ; the Vandals returned to the cellar of the conference in each of the next three seasons and attendance  In March 1986, Trumbo was succeeded by Tim Floyd, an assistant under hall of fame head coach Don Haskins at 

With Monson for all five seasons at Idaho, Collier joined him at Oregon for three more, then was at Stanford for three seasons under Mike Montgomery. He became a head coach at his alma mater Butler in 1989, led the Bulldogs for eleven years, then went to Nebraska for six seasons.

(In each of the previous five seasons of the late 1970s, Idaho had finished last in the Big Sky.) (From the Tri-Cities, Kellerman was the player of the year in Washington as high school senior in 1979, but was passed on by the Pac-10 schools.)

With only two home games, they went  overall against the four Northwest schools of the Pac-10, the strongest at the time was Oregon State; the Beavers won three of the five. Oregon dropped all three, the Cougars lost the last three, and Washington the last two. The Vandals also swept all four games from Gonzaga, (with hall of fame point guard John Stockton for the last  and won consecutive Far West Classics

All-conference
In addition to Kellerman, senior center Kelvin Smith was also named to the All-Big Sky team; he was honorable mention the previous season. Senior forward Phil Hopson was on the second team for a third consecutive year, and junior point guard Stan Arnold was honored as the conference's newcomer of the year.

Roster

Schedule and results

|-
!colspan=9 style=| Big Sky tournament

|-
!colspan=9 style=| National Invitation Tournament

References

External links
Sports Reference – Idaho Vandals: 1982–83 basketball season
Gem of the Mountains: 1983 University of Idaho yearbook – 1982–83 basketball season
Idaho Argonaut – student newspaper – 1983 editions

Idaho Vandals men's basketball seasons
Idaho
Idaho
Idaho
Idaho